Sarah Brianne Blair (born 29 April 1980) is a Canadian actress. She has played Stacey in the 1995 film The Baby-Sitters Club and Jessie West in the 2016 television drama series Game of Silence.

Life and career
Her first major role was portraying Stacey McGill in the 1995 movie The Baby-Sitters Club.

Blair appeared in an episode of Love, Inc., as the character Claire. She has also appeared in the Psych episode "Shawn vs. the Red Phantom", on Nip/Tuck as Janet, and in The O.C. episode "The Shake Up" as Carrie Spitz. She also appeared in the comedy drama What About Brian as Lisa B. In 2008, she appeared in an episode of Grey's Anatomy titled "Brave New World".

From 2008 until 2009, she portrayed Joss Morgan Grey in the fourth season of The Unit. In 2013, she appeared in the movie Last Vegas, in which she plays the fiancée of Michael Douglas's character.

In 2016 she starred in the NBC drama Game of Silence.

Since 2017 she has had a recurring role as Annie Kay on the CBS Police Drama S.W.A.T. opposite Jay Harrington.

Filmography

Film

Television

References

External links
 
 

Canadian child actresses
Canadian television actresses
1980 births
Living people
20th-century Canadian actresses
21st-century Canadian actresses